The MV Kaleetan is a  operated by Washington State Ferries.

The Kaleetan (meaning arrow in Chinook) is named for a mountain peak northwest of Snoqualmie Pass. She can hold 144 vehicles, and 1868 passengers. She is in the third largest class of Washington State Ferries. She was built by National Steel and Shipbuilding in San Diego in 1967.

The Kaleetan went into service in early 1968 serving the Seattle-Bainbridge Island route. She remained in the San Juans, until 1999, when she got a midlife upgrade.

Since its midlife overhaul, the Kaleetan has generally been assigned to the Seattle-Bremerton route, with periodic assignments in the San Juans when necessitated by maintenance schedules.

References

External links 

Vessel info from WSDOT

Washington State Ferries vessels
1967 ships